Phase reduction is a method used to reduce a multi-dimensional dynamical equation describing a nonlinear limit cycle oscillator into a one-dimensional phase equation. Many phenomena in our world such as chemical reactions, electric circuits, mechanical vibrations, cardiac cells, and spiking neurons are examples of rhythmic phenomena, and can be considered as nonlinear limit cycle oscillators.

History
The theory of phase reduction method was first introduced in the 1950s, the existence of periodic solutions to nonlinear oscillators under perturbation, has been discussed by Malkin in, in the 1960s, Winfree illustrated the importance of the notion of phase and formulated the phase model for a population of nonlinear oscillators in his studies on biological synchronization. Since then, many researchers have discovered different rhythmic phenomena related to phase reduction theory.

Phase model of reduction
Consider the dynamical system of the form

where  is the oscillator state variable,  is the baseline vector field. Let  be the flow induced by the system, that is,  is the solution of the system for the initial condition . When a neuron is perturbed by a stimulus current, the dynamics of the perturbed system will no longer be the same with the dynamics of the baseline neural oscillator.

The target here is to reduce the system by defining a phase for each point in some neighbourhood of the limit cycle. The allowance of sufficiently small perturbations (e.g. external forcing or stimulus effect to the system) might cause a large deviation of the phase, but the amplitude is perturbed slightly because of the attracting of the limit cycle. Hence we need to extend the definition of the phase to points in the neighborhood of the cycle by introducing the definition of asymptotic phase (or latent phase). This helps us to assign a phase to each point in the basin of attraction of a periodic orbit. The set of points in the basin of attraction of  that share the same asymptotic phase  is called the isochron (e.g. see Figure 1), which were first introduced by Winfree. Isochrons can be shown to exist for such a stable hyperbolic limit cycle .  So for all point  in some neighbourhood of the cycle, the evolution of the phase  can be given by the relation , where  is the natural frequency of the oscillation. By the chain rule we then obtain an equation that govern the evolution of the phase of the neuron model is given by the phase model:

where  is the gradient of the phase function  with respect to the vector of the neuron's state vector , for the derivation of this result, see  This means that the -dimensional system describing the oscillating neuron dynamics is then reduced to a simple one-dimensional phase equation. One can notice that, it is impossible to retrieve the full information of the oscillator  from the phase  because 
 is not one-to-one mapping.

Phase model with external forcing
Consider now a weakly perturbed system of the form

Assuming that the baseline neural oscillator (that is, when )  has an exponentially stable limit cycle  with period  (example, see Figure 1)  that is normally hyperbolic, it can be shown that  persists under small perturbations. This implies that for a small perturbation, the perturbed system will remain close to the limit cycle. Hence we assume that such a limit cycle always exists for each neuron.

The evolution of the perturbed system in terms of the isochrons is 

This phase equation is a partial differential equation (PDE).

where function  measures the normalized phase shift due to a small perturbation delivered at any point  on the limit cycle , and is called the phase sensitivity function or infinitesimal phase response curve.

In order to analyze the reduced phase equation corresponding to the perturbed nonlinear system, we need to solve a PDE, which is not a trivial one.

By the method of averaging, assuming that  does not vary within , we obtain an approximated phase equation

 
The graph of this function  can be shown to exhibit the dynamics of the approximated phase model, for more illustrations see.

Examples of phase reduction
For a sufficiently small perturbation of a certain nonlinear oscillator or a network of coupled oscillators, we can compute the corresponding phase sensitivity function or infinitesimal PRC .

References 

Dynamical systems